Nadia Hilker  is a German actress and model, known for her roles in Spring (2014), The 100 (2016–2017), and The Walking Dead (2018–2022).

Career
Hilker was on camera for numerous German and international magazines and fashion companies and shot commercials for, among others, Clearasil and C & A. Through modeling, she came to acting. In the ARD feature film Zimmer mit Auntie she played the female lead role alongside Jutta Speidel and Ingo Naujoks. This was followed by numerous series appearances and other roles in television films such as Rosamunde Pilcher's The Other Woman with Rupert Everett and Natalia Wörner. In 2014 she took over the female lead role in the feature film Spring.

A short film in which Hilker played a part was In the Gallery by Kai Sitter. The project was released in Munich in August 2013. The main focus of the film is on the relationships between five different characters, their encounters in a closed space and their interaction with each other. In this film, she shared the leading role with the actor and producer Seren Sahin. The film celebrated its premiere in May 2014 in Berlin at the Moviemento and Kino Babylon. In the Gallery has received positive feedback in Turkish cinema magazines and newspapers.

From 2016 to 2017, Hilker was in seven episodes of the science fiction television series The 100.

In 2018, Hilker joined the cast of the AMC TV series The Walking Dead, playing a character named Magna.

In 2020, Hilker was in an episode of the second season of The Twilight Zone television series.

Filmography

Film

Television

References

External links
 

1988 births
German film actresses
Living people
Actresses from Munich
21st-century German actresses